Cindere Dam is a gravity dam on the Büyük Menderes River in Denizli Province, Turkey. The development was backed by the Turkish State Hydraulic Works.

See also

List of dams and reservoirs in Turkey

External links
DSI, State Hydraulic Works (Turkey), Retrieved December 16, 2009

Dams in Denizli Province
Hydroelectric power stations in Turkey
Dams completed in 2007